The Kellett XR-10 was a military transport helicopter developed in the United States in the 1940s that only flew in prototype form. It was designed in response to a USAAF Technical Instruction issued for the development of a helicopter to transport passengers, cargo, or wounded personnel within an enclosed fuselage. Kellett's proposal followed the general layout that the company was developing in the XR-8, with twin intermeshing rotors, and was accepted by the Air Force on 16 October over proposals by Sikorsky, Bell, and Platt-LePage.

The XR-10 resembled a scaled-up XR-8, although its twin engines were carried in nacelles at the fuselage sides, driving the rotors via long driveshafts, and the aircraft was skinned entirely in metal. The first of two prototypes flew on 24 April 1947, and at the time, was the largest rotorcraft to fly in the United States. During test-flights, however, the same problem that had been encountered with the XR-8's rotor system emerged when blades from the two rotors collided in flight. With fixes in place, flight testing continued, but on 3 October 1949, the first prototype crashed due to a control system failure and killed Kellett's chief test pilot, Dave Driskill. The project was abandoned shortly thereafter, and a 16-seat civil variant, the KH-2, never left the drawing board.

Specifications

References
Notes

Bibliography
 
 
 
 

 aerofiles.com
 NASM website

External links

  "Heaviest Copter Checks Out" , September 1947, Popular Science bottom of page

1940s United States military transport aircraft
1940s United States helicopters
R-10
Aircraft first flown in 1947
Twin-engined piston helicopters
Synchropters